Walter "Hawk" Newsome is an American law school graduate who co-founded Black Lives Matter of Greater New York alongside his sister Chivona Newsome.

Biography 
Growing up, Newsome argued with his parents and younger sister, Chivona, about events they saw on the news. Newsome says he "was brought up to have a revolutionary heart" by his parents, who met in the 1960s at a civil rights protest. When Hawk and Chivona were young, their father became ill, forcing Hawk to look after his younger sister. Newsome dropped out of high school, but later attended Concordia College in Bronxville, New York and received a J.D. degree from Touro College Law Center in New York City. Afterwards, Newsome worked as a paralegal for the Bronx District Attorney's Office and also worked as a project manager at the law firm Wilson Elser Moskowitz Edelman & Dicker. He unsuccessfully ran for a seat on the New York City Council from The Bronx, garnering around 3% of the vote on a platform Newsome said was "too radical". He subsequently co-founded Black Lives Matter of Greater New York with Chivona Newsome. Chivona later stepped down from the group to run for a U.S. House seat in The Bronx.

In September 2021, Newsome called COVID-19 vaccine mandates "racist" and "discrimination."

In November 2021, Newsome threatened "riots", "fire", and "bloodshed" in the streets if New York City mayor-elect Eric Adams reinstated the New York City Police Department's (NYPD) controversial anti-crime units. Later, when asked whether he condemned riots and burning down buildings after a police use-of-force incident he did not approve of he said, "I’m not going to condemn, nor am I going to condone it."

Newsome has filed two ongoing civil lawsuits against the NYPD, alleging that he was assaulted by police officers and falsely arrested during two separate protests in 2017 and 2018. A video posted by the New York Daily News shows a police officer punching Newsome before several police officers tackled him to the ground. Newsome was holding a sign that read: "Blue Klux Klan".

Relationship with BLM 
In June 2020, then-U.S. President Donald Trump described Newsome in a tweet as a "Black Lives Matter leader." This description of Newsome prompted a response from managing director of the Black Lives Matter Global Network Foundation Kailee Scales, who stated that Newsome "has no relation to the Black Lives Matter Global Network", "is not the 'president' of BLM or any of its chapters.", and that his group "is not a chapter of BLM and has not entered into any agreement with BLM agreeing to adhere to BLM's core principles.", adding "The only official chapter of BLM in New York is Black Lives Matter NYC."

Personal life 
Newsome lives in The Bronx in New York City. He regularly attends Baptist service and smokes cigars. Newsome often wears a bulletproof vest and drives a rotation of rented vehicles for security and safety purposes.

References 

Year of birth missing (living people)
Living people
21st-century American politicians
Activists from New York City
African-American activists
American anti-racism activists